Route 372 is a provincial highway located in the Saguenay–Lac-Saint-Jean region in central Quebec. The highway runs exclusively inside the city of Saguenay and runs from Jonquière (at Autoroute 70) to La Baie (Route 170). In Chicoutimi, it is also concurrent with Route 175 and through a large portion of the length it is parallel to the Saguenay River.

Towns along Route 372

 Saguenay - including Jonquière, Chicoutimi and La Baie

See also

 List of Quebec provincial highways

References

External links 
 Official Transports Quebec Map 
 Route 372 on Google Maps

372
Roads in Saguenay–Lac-Saint-Jean
Transport in Saguenay, Quebec